Ladislav Molnár (born 12 September 1960) is a Slovak football manager and former goalkeeper.

Honours

Manager
1.FC Košice
Slovak Cup: Runners-up: 1999-00

Koba Senec
Slovak Cup (1): 2001-02
Dukla B.Bystrica
Slovak Super Liga Runners-Up (1): 2003-04

References

External links

1960 births
Living people
People from Trnava District
Sportspeople from the Trnava Region
Association football goalkeepers
Czechoslovak footballers
Czechoslovakia international footballers
Slovak footballers
Slovakia international footballers
Dukla Prague footballers
FC Nitra players
MŠK Žilina players
FK Inter Bratislava players
ŠK Slovan Bratislava players
FC VSS Košice players
Slovak Super Liga players
Slovak football managers
FC VSS Košice managers
FC Spartak Trnava managers
Újpest FC managers
FK Dukla Banská Bystrica managers
1. FC Slovácko managers
Dual internationalists (football)